Oglahty (Russian: Оглахты) is a mountain range and a burial complex of Tashtyk culture located 60 km north of Minusinsk, Khakassia, Russia, on the right bank of Yenisei River. Oglahty burials are dated to ca. 1st century BC. The burials were first surveyed in 1903 by A.V. Adrianov. The dryness of the soil and favorable climatic conditions in the burial monument preserved perishable materials including wood, leather, fur, and fabrics. A prominent place among artifacts in the Oglahty complex occupy solid and decorated polychromatic fabrics. They are preserved in the Hermitage Museum of Saint Petersburg (see the pictures).

References
Adrianov A.V. "Selected notes from diaries of the kurgan excavation in Minusinsk territory", Minusinsk, 1924

History of Siberia
Archaeological sites in Russia
Archaeological collections of the Hermitage Museum
Geography of Khakassia
Mountain ranges of Russia
Landforms of Khakassia